Medicare Access and CHIP Reauthorization Act of 2015 (MACRA), commonly called the Permanent Doc Fix, is a United States statute. Revising the Balanced Budget Act of 1997, the Bipartisan Act was the largest scale change to the American health care system following the Affordable Care Act in 2010.

Provisions 
MACRA's primary provisions are:
 changes to the way Medicare doctors are reimbursed
 increased funding
 extension to the Children's Health Insurance Program (CHIP).
MACRA related regulations also address incentives for use of health information technology by physicians and other providers. It created the Medicare Quality Payment Program. Clinicians can choose to participate in the Quality Payment Program through the Merit-based Incentive Payment System (MIPS) or Advanced Alternative Payment Models (APMs). MIPS is an incentive program that consolidates three incentive programs into one, for eligible physicians. APMs allow clinicians to earn incentives for participating in innovative payment models. In 2026, the conversion factor for both programs will be set at 0.75%.

The Government Accountability Office in partnership with DHHS is set to assist in the implementation of nationwide electronic health records (EHR), while simultaneously comparing and recommending such programs for providers; the EHR goal is set for December 31, 2018 under MACRA.

The US is set to transition from a fee for service system, which allowed physicians and providers to bill Medicare and Medicaid for services they provided to their patients, to a pay for performance based system using MIP, APM, and Accountable Care Organizations (ACO).

Related
 Health Insurance Portability and Accountability Act (HIPAA)

References

External links
 
 
 
 

Acts of the 114th United States Congress
Healthcare reform legislation in the United States
Presidency of Barack Obama
United States federal health legislation